Splicing factor 3B, 14 kDa subunit, also known as SF3B14, is a human gene.

Function 

This gene encodes a 14 kDa protein subunit of the splicing factor 3b complex. Splicing factor 3b associates with both the U2 and U11/U12 small nuclear ribonucleoprotein complexes (U2 snRNP) of spliceosomes. This 14 kDa protein interacts directly with subunit 1 of the splicing factor 3b complex. This 14 kDa protein also interacts directly with the adenosine that carries out the first transesterification step of splicing at the pre-mRNA branch site.

Interactions 

SF3B14 has been shown to interact with SF3B1.

References

Further reading